Search for Tomorrow is an American television soap opera. It began its run on CBS on September 3, 1951, and concluded on NBC, 35 years later, on December 26, 1986.

Set in the fictional town of Henderson in an unspecified state, the show focused primarily on the character of Joanne, known to the audience as "Jo." Actress Mary Stuart played Jo for the entire run.

Broadcast history and production notes
Search for Tomorrow was created by Roy Winsor and was first written by Agnes Nixon (then known professionally as Agnes Eckhardt) for the series' first 13 weeks and later by Irving Vendig. The program was one of several daytime soap operas produced from the 1950s through the 1980s by Procter & Gamble Productions, the broadcasting arm of the famed household products corporation. Procter & Gamble used the program, as well as the company's other serials, to advertise its products (such as its Joy dishwashing liquid and Spic and Span household cleaner). As Searchs ratings increased, other sponsors began buying commercial time during the program.

Search for Tomorrow initially aired as a 15-minute serial from its debut in 1951 until 1968, at 12:30 p.m. Eastern/11:30 a.m. Central Time. The serial discontinued live broadcasts in favor of recorded telecasts in March 1967, began broadcasting in color on September 11, 1967, and expanded to a half-hour on September 9, 1968, keeping the 12:30/11:30 slot, while its old 15-minute partner The Guiding Light also expanded to 30 minutes and moved to the CBS afternoon lineup at 2:30/1:30. At the time, Search for Tomorrow and The Guiding Light, which had shared the same half hour for sixteen years, were the last two 15-minute daytime programs airing on television. Search for Tomorrow would remain the top-rated show at 12:30/11:30 well into the late 1970s, despite strong competition from shows like NBC's The Who, What, or Where Game and ABC's Split Second and Ryan's Hope.

On June 8, 1981, CBS moved Search for Tomorrow from its longtime 12:30 p.m./11:30 a.m. Central time slot, which it had held for 30 years, to the 2:30/1:30 p.m. time slot between As the World Turns and Guiding Light' 'its two P&G sister shows in order to accommodate the hit serial The Young and the Restless. Procter & Gamble urged CBS to return Search for Tomorrow to its former slot. The program's relocation confused or angered many longtime viewers habituated to seeing it earlier in the day. Another P&G-produced soap opera, The Edge of Night, had suffered the same problem six years earlier when the company insisted that the show be moved to the 2:30/1:30 p.m. time slot; it had previously dominated the other two networks in the ratings for the 3:30/2:30 p.m. slot for almost a decade. The network refused to move Search for Tomorrow back to its original 12:30/11:30 time slot and, as the show's contract with CBS was about to expire, Procter & Gamble sold the broadcast rights to Search for Tomorrow to NBC rather than negotiate a renewal with CBS. NBC already had two soaps produced by the company, Another World and its Dallas-inspired spin-off Texas, as part of its daytime lineup. Search for Tomorrow aired its last episode on CBS on March 26, 1982, and had its NBC premiere the following Monday, March 29; CBS filled the program's former time slot with a new political soap opera, Capitol.

The shift from CBS to NBC would prove to be the beginning of the serial's terminal decline. As an NBC program, Search for Tomorrow now found itself going head-to-head with its former CBS stablemate The Young and the Restless and would later face additional soap competition when Loving premiered on ABC in June 1983. Additionally, several NBC-affiliated stations opted to run syndicated programming or local newscasts in the 12:00/11:00 slot, a practice dating back to NBC's daytime ratings struggles in the 1970s that also affected already struggling soap opera The Doctors, which was airing at 12:30/11:30, until NBC bumped it to 12:00/11:00 (the fourth and final time slot that the show occupied during its 19-year run) to accommodate Search for Tomorrow. (The Doctors, along with Texas, were both canceled at the end of 1982.) As a result, Search for Tomorrows ratings plummeted through its four-year run on NBC and never recovered; it was among the lowest-rated soaps on television at the time, kept alive mainly by its hardcore and largely elderly fans. As such, the show was increasingly unappealing to advertisers other than P&G. (The Edge of Night faced similar issues following its move to ABC in the 4:00/3:00 timeslot, where it did only slightly better in the ratings, before being cancelled in 1984 due to the erosion of its overall ratings caused in part by affiliate preemptions for syndicated programming.)

On August 4, 1983, both the master copy and the backup of an episode of Search for Tomorrow scheduled for that day were reported missing, and the cast was forced to do a live show for the first time since the transition to recorded broadcasts 16 years earlier. It was the first live daytime serial since two other CBS soaps, As The World Turns and The Edge of Night, had discontinued the practice in 1975; to date, it is the last soap opera to do so.

In the fall of 1986, NBC announced that Search for Tomorrow would be canceled, citing its declining ratings. The show aired its 9,130th and final episode on December 26, 1986, after 35 years on the air. At the time of its cancellation, it was the longest-running daytime program in American television history, but has since been surpassed by other shows. The following Monday, the game show Wordplay took over the 12:30 p.m. Eastern time slot.

Syndication
From 1987 until the summer of 1989, reruns of Search for Tomorrow aired late nights on the USA Network. The cable network aired episodes from the first three years on NBC (1982–1985), along with its sister P&G soap The Edge Of Night ABC episodes (June 1981- through December 1984 the shows final year).

In 2006, P&G began making several of its soap operas available, a few episodes at a time, through America Online's AOL Video service, downloadable free of charge.  Reruns of Search for Tomorrow'' began with the October 5, 1984, episode and ceased with the January 13, 1986, episode after AOL discontinued the P&G Soaps Channel on December 31, 2008.

Cast members

Awards

Daytime Emmy Award wins

Drama performer categories

Other categories
 1986 "Outstanding Achievement in Music Direction and Composition for a Drama Series"
 1978 "Outstanding Individual Achievement in Daytime Programming: Costume Designer" (Connie Wexler)

Other awards
 Writers Guild of America Award (1974, 1975, 1985)

References

Notes

External links

 
 Search for Tomorrow Script Collection  at Syracuse University Special Collection Research Center – breakdowns and scripts from 550+ episodes, 1971–74
Soap Opera scripts, 1975–89 Billy Rose Theatre Division, The New York Public Library.

1951 American television series debuts
1950s American television series
1960s American television series
1970s American television series
1980s American television series
1986 American television series endings
American television soap operas
Black-and-white American television shows
CBS original programming
English-language television shows
NBC original programming
Television series by Procter & Gamble Productions
CBS network soap operas
NBC network soap operas
Television series created by Roy Winsor
Television shows filmed in New York (state)